Reflections in Blue  may refer to:
Reflections in Blue (Art Blakey album), recorded in 1978
Reflections in Blue (Sun Ra album), recorded in 1986